American Dresser is a 2018 American adventure drama film written and directed by Carmine Cangialosi and starring Tom Berenger, Keith David, Gina Gershon, Penelope Ann Miller, Jeff Fahey and Bruce Dern.

Cast
Tom Berenger as John Moore
Keith David as Charlie
Carmine Cangialosi as Willie
Gina Gershon as Sandra
Penelope Ann Miller as Vera
Bruce Dern as King
Jeff Fahey as Calhoun

Reception
The film has  rating on Rotten Tomatoes.

References

External links
 
 

2018 films
American adventure drama films
2010s adventure drama films
2018 drama films
2010s English-language films
2010s American films